The 2021 Liga 2 was the fifth season of the Liga 2 under its current name and the 12th season under its current league structure.

Persis won the title after a 2–1 win over RANS Cilegon in the final at Pakansari Stadium, Cibinong on 30 December 2021.

Effects of the COVID-19 pandemic

Cancellation of the 2020 season 
The season was suspended on 15 March 2020 after finishing the matchday one due to the COVID-19 pandemic. The initial suspension was until the end of March, which was then extended to 29 May.
On 27 June 2020, PSSI issued a decree to continue Liga 1,Liga 2 & Liga 3 from October 2020.

On 7 August 2020, PT Liga Indonesia Baru made several announcements. The season restarted from the beginning with a different format. In the first round, 24 teams were drawn into four groups consisting of six teams. All groups are played a home tournament format where teams play each other once. Group winners and runners-ups will be advance to the second round, which will be drawn into two groups of four. Two best teams will be qualified to the semi-finals. Semi-finals and final will be played a single-legged fixtures. Two finalists will be promoted to Liga 1. All matches are held and played behind closed doors.

After failing to obtain government and police permissions for the umpteenth time, PSSI on 29 September 2020 announced the second postponement of the 2020 season of Liga 1 and Liga 2. This time the initial suspension had a one-month period. After the end date was reached, PSSI on 29 October 2020 declared the 2020 football seasons could not be held in 2020. There was an attempt to resume the 2020 season in 2021. However, on 15 January 2021, PSSI decided to cancel the 2020 season of all football competitions and declared them void.

Teams

Team changes
The following teams changed division after the 2019 season.

Name changes
 Semeru relocated to Sidoarjo and were renamed to Hizbul Wathan.
 Babel United merged with Muba United into Muba Babel United and relocated to Musi Banyuasin.
 Putra Sinar Giri relocated to Pati and were renamed to Putra Safin Group Pati (PSG Pati). However, in June 2021, the club was acquired by Atta Halilintar and renamed themselves again into AHHA PS Pati, although the name change won't come into effect until next season. 
 Martapura relocated to Tangerang and were renamed to Dewa United.
 Cilegon United were bought out by Raffi Ahmad and rebranded themselves into RANS Cilegon.

Stadiums and locations

Personnel and kits
Note: Flags indicate national team as has been defined under FIFA eligibility rules. Players and coaches may hold more than one non-FIFA nationality.

Notes:

 On the front of shirt.
 On the back of shirt.
 On the sleeves.
 On the shorts.

Coaching changes

Draw 
The draw of the tournament was held on 16 September 2021. The draw resulted in the following groups:

First round

Group A 
 Matches in the first half were played in Gelora Sriwijaya Stadium, Palembang, South Sumatra, while the second half were played in Kaharudin Nasution Stadium, Pekanbaru, Riau.

Group B 
 All matches were played in Madya Stadium, Central Jakarta, Jakarta.

Group C 
 All matches were played in Manahan Stadium, Surakarta, Central Java.

Group D 
 Matches in the first half were played in Tuah Pahoe Stadium, Palangka Raya, Central Kalimantan, while the second half were played in Batakan Stadium, Balikpapan, East Kalimantan.

Second round 
The top two teams of each group will advance to the semi-finals. Matches will be played in Pakansari Stadium, Cibinong and Wibawa Mukti Stadium, Cikarang. It was announced that some fans would be allowed to return to stadiums on a limited basis.

All times are local, WIB (UTC+7).

Group X

Group Y

Knockout round  
All times are local, WIB (UTC+7).

Semi-finals

Third place

Final

Top goalscorers

See also 
 2021–22 Liga 1
 2021–22 Liga 3

References 

Liga 2
Liga 2
Liga 2
Indonesia
Liga 2